Marie-Helene Östlund (née Westin, born 14 May 1966), is a retired Swedish cross-country skier. Östlund won a world championship title on the 20 km in Oberstdorf, West Germany, in 1987. For the feat, she was awarded the Svenska Dagbladet Gold Medal, shared with the Swedish ice hockey team. She is married to fellow Swedish cross-country skier Erik Östlund.

In 1994 and 1995, she won Tjejvasan.

Cross-country skiing results
All results are sourced from the International Ski Federation (FIS).

Olympic Games

World Championships
 4 medals – (1 gold, 1 silver, 2 bronze)

World Cup

Season standings

Individual podiums
 2 victories
 9 podiums

Team podiums

 4 podiums

Note:   Until the 1999 World Championships, World Championship races were included in the World Cup scoring system.

References

External links

1966 births
Living people
Cross-country skiers at the 1988 Winter Olympics
Cross-country skiers at the 1992 Winter Olympics
Cross-country skiers at the 1994 Winter Olympics
FIS Nordic World Ski Championships medalists in cross-country skiing
Swedish female cross-country skiers
Olympic cross-country skiers of Sweden
People from Sollefteå Municipality
20th-century Swedish women